Shatzi Weisberger (June 17, 1930 – December 1, 2022) was an American death educator, activist, and nurse in New York City. Weisberger turned to death education in her later life after a 47-year career as a nurse, during which she also became associated with various activist groups and movements. Her involvement in activism spanned the civil rights movement, the anti-nuclear movement, ACT UP, opposition to police brutality in the United States including through Black Lives Matter, and anti-Zionism as a member of Jewish Voice for Peace.

Born Joyce Schatzberg in 1930 to a lesbian mother and a homophobic father, Weisberger grew up in Brooklyn and was not close with either of her parents. She later began an 18-year marriage to a man; the couple adopted two children but the relationship eventually became unhappy and she broke it off after reading The Feminine Mystique. She subsequently realized she was a lesbian.

As a nurse, Weisberger focused on obstetrics and end-of-life care. Her nursing career coincided with the peak of HIV/AIDS-related deaths in the 1980s, and she worked as a home care nurse for the dying, also becoming a member of ACT UP among other activist groups. She served as a Brooklyn Independence Party organizer for 25 years, and was an active protestor against police brutality and supporter of abolition of the police and of prisons. She was additionally associated with anti-Zionism, and became affiliated with the New York chapter of Jewish Voice for Peace in her final years. She additionally gained an interest in death education as her own death approached, hosting death cafés and inviting a New York Times reporter to cover the end of her life. Weisberger died of pancreatic cancer on December 1, 2022.

Early life 
Shatzi Weisberger was born Joyce Schatzberg in Brooklyn on June 17, 1930. Her mother was a lesbian and once served as grand marshal of a pride parade; Weisberger grew up in a small apartment with her and her mother's female partner, though she was not aware of their relationship at the time. Weisberger did not have a close relationship with either of her parents, and was once kidnapped by her father after her mother came out as a lesbian; she spent time in the foster care system as a result of her father's homophobia. She attended summer camp as a child.

Weisberger's great-grandfather was Samuel Gompers, a founder of the American Federation of Labor. Her mother and grandparents often spoke about Gompers while she was growing up; she often wrote about him for school assignments.

Weisberger was married to a man named Gene Weisberger for 18 years, and they had a son and a daughter, adopted from Greece and California respectively; she left the unhappy marriage after reading The Feminine Mystique. She later realized she was a lesbian. Weisberger became estranged from her children.

Career 
Weisberger worked as a nurse for 47 years, focusing on obstetrics and end-of-life care. Her nursing career saw the peak of deaths caused by HIV/AIDS in New York in the 1980s, and she worked as a home care nurse for those dying of the disease.

In the 2010s, Weisberger sought out education about thanatology, hospice care, and "the art of dying" in order to become a death educator after caring for a close friend who was dying. She began hosting death cafés, which transitioned online at the start of the COVID-19 pandemic. Weisberger is associated with the positive death movement as opposed to palliative care.

Activism 
Weisberger's activism began with direct action against redlining in suburban Long Island. She was part of a group that encouraged families of color to visit real estate agents and ask about specific homes; after the families were told that a deposit had already been made on the home they inquired about, Weisberger would expose the discrimination by making the same inquiry and being invited to make an offer for purchase. She was also active in the civil rights movement.

Weisberger was a political lesbian for a period of time, a member of ACT UP, and a part of the public opposition to nuclear technology as a member of Dykes Opposed to Nuclear Technology. One of her earliest acts of activism took place at a die-in in New York City, where she cried because she felt that she was "in the right place doing the right things with the right people". She was jailed as a result of her actions against nuclear weapons. In addition, Weisberger was an organizer with the Independence Party of New York City (which broke away from the Independence Party of New York) for 25 years.

Weisberger was present at numerous protests and demonstrations in New York, leading The Advocate to describe her as "a fixture". She was active in protests against police brutality in the United States, supported abolition of the police and of prisons, and was associated with anti-Zionism. At one Black Lives Matter protest in June 2020, which occurred on her 90th birthday, she was dubbed "the people's bubbie" (a Yiddish term for a grandmother); she wrote a column in HuffPost stating that she wanted the police to be abolished for her 90th birthday, stating that the "only way all people will ever be able to live and die as they wish is if we pursue abolition". She broke curfew to attend another Black Lives Matter protest. Her protest signs, such as one reading "Jewish dyke standing with Palestinian queers", became well-known.

In 2021, Weisberger cited her age as a positive contributor to her activism, explaining that her presence "brings attention to the issues that matter" and expressing an intent to participate in "as many demonstrations as I possibly can".

Views on Zionism 

Weisberger grew up as a Zionist; she hoped to travel to Israel and live on a kibbutz. She later described this as the result of "brainwashing" during her childhood. She has stated that around 1983, someone suggested that she read a book she no longer remembered the title of, and it led her to begin questioning her views on Zionism and eventually to oppose the ideology entirely. This took place roughly a year after the Shatila massacre.

As she became associated with the anti-Zionist movement, Weisberger worked with the Palestinian Defense Committee founded by Rabab Abdulhadi, staffing their literature table at various events. She also led Palestine-related workshops at the Michigan Womyn's Music Festival. She worked to build the political consciousness of other Jewish lesbians, arguing in a 1986 issue of WomaNews that "Jewish women in particular need to educate ourselves about the history of Zionism."

Weisberger was a member of Jewish Voice for Peace and associated with its New York City chapter for the last six years of her life, and told Middle East Eye in 2021 that being part of a community of Jewish anti-Zionists made it "much easier to protest against Zionism than it was before".

Later life and death 

In her later life Weisberger was diagnosed with macular degeneration and required the use of a walker to remain mobile. She was unable to take the New York City Subway, instead using paratransit service Access-A-Ride to get to protests. She sang as part of the Brooklyn Women's Chorus. Asked about her "secret to longevity" in an interview for Glorious Broads, she cited dietary supplements, always being passionately engaged in a project, avoiding stress, drinking green tea, and smoking marijuana every night.

Weisberger spent time in the final years of her life with a chosen family made up largely of young transgender and queer Jews. She made repeated excursions with this group to destinations including Riis Beech and Queer Pier, and to various protests. She lived with a cat named Rosa.

In 2018, Weisberger held a "FUN-eral" for herself in the common room of an Upper West Side apartment building. Guests decorated a cardboard coffin, ate and sang, and Weisberger spoke about death and dying. Wearing a colorful floral blouse for the occasion, she said that she wanted to experience her own death and "to share the experience with anybody who’s interested". She told John Leland of The New York Times that she had worried she might die before hosting the funeral.

Weisberger experienced symptoms of a heart attack in 2020 during the COVID-19 lockdown in New York. Rather than going to a hospital, she stayed home and recovered there.

In April 2022, Weisberger told the LGBTQ&A podcast that she hoped to have time to experience the dying process in her own home; items in her house were tagged with the name of the person to whom she wanted to bequeath them. She expressed a desire for people to say their goodbyes and pick up their bequeath items before she died, and did not wish to be drugged. She planned to be buried in a forest in Upstate New York. She had additionally preselected a funeral director and a shroud.

After being diagnosed with untreatable pancreatic cancer in October 2022, Weisberger called Leland the following month, inviting him to report on the end of her life (and asking him to bring her a cannabis edible). On November 18, she told Leland that she was getting her wish of experiencing the process of dying, and that while she was in extreme pain and unable to sleep she was "experiencing the best time of [her] life".

In preparation for her death, Weisberger contacted her estranged son. She attempted to do the same with her daughter, who was unwilling to reconnect. Despite difficulty caused by a labor shortage and high costs, she secured in-home hospice care with the aid of friends and a GoFundMe created by Jewish Voice for Peace. By November 21, she was in the company of friends and hospice care, and on that day two film crews came to her apartment; Vogue was working on a profile of her. Despite her wishes not to be drugged before her death, she wore a fentanyl patch to reduce pain, and had a morphine elixir, but had not yet used it.

Weisberger had a "pain emergency" on November 25 and increased her dosage of pain medication. On November 30, she postponed an interview with Vogue and did not see visitors, increasing her medication again. She died at 12:40 a.m. on December 1. That same day, the New York chapter of Jewish Voice for Peace posted on Instagram that Weisberger had died the night before at her home, in accordance with her wishes. An obituary published in BuzzFeed News noted that her death was widely mourned on social media, while Them reported that a "joyous online memorial" and celebration of life was being planned. Middle East Eye characterized her as a "Jewish American abolitionist and feminist, who became a beloved symbol of intersectional solidarity for queer rights, Black Lives Matter, and pro-Palestinian demonstrations in New York City". The publication quoted a post on Twitter by Egyptian activist and academic Alia ElKattan, who wrote that she had encountered Weisberger at a Palestine-related event the week before her death. Weisberger's body was oiled and bathed by a group of her close friends, and she was buried in Rosendale, New York on December 2.

References 

1930 births
2022 deaths
Activists from New York City
American people of Dutch-Jewish descent
American people of English-Jewish descent
Anti-nuclear activists
Anti-Zionist Jews
Black Lives Matter people
HIV/AIDS activists
Jewish American activists
Jewish anti-Zionism in the United States
LGBT Jews
Nurses from New York (state)
Political lesbians